Sherwood Mall is one of two shopping malls in Stockton, California. It is next to Weberstown Mall. Opened in 1979, it features Macy's, Best Buy, Petco, Ulta, HomeGoods, Dick's Sporting Goods, and Sky Zone. It is owned and managed by Stone Brothers.

History
Sherwood Mall was built in 1979 by Stone Brothers, who continue to own the mall. Its original anchor stores were Macy's and Montgomery Ward, which closed in 2001. It was expanded in 1987 with a new wing featuring a food court, Toys "R" Us and a Gottschalks, which remained until the chain filed for bankruptcy in 2009.

In 2002, Best Buy opened in part of the vacated Montgomery Ward store. The rest later became Petco. A year later, Toys "R" Us closed its store and decided to move its store nearby lot, which was located next to Montgomery Ward. The Toys "R" Us space became HomeGoods in 2005 while the rest later became Shoe Pavilion. The interior mall was renovated that same year. Part of the renovations added a Shoe Pavilion, which closed and became Ulta. In September 2014, Dick's Sporting Goods opened in the old Gottschalks anchor while the rest later became Sky Zone..

The property will undergo redevelopment in 2022 to make way for a new Sprouts Farmers Market and other tenants, according to a press release. The mall will remain open during construction, which is expected to last until Spring 2023. As part of these changes, the mall will be renamed Sherwood Place.

References

External links
Official website

Shopping malls in California
Shopping malls established in 1979
Buildings and structures in Stockton, California
1979 establishments in California